The Coma Cluster (Abell 1656) is a large cluster of galaxies that contains over 1,000 identified galaxies. Along with the Leo Cluster (Abell 1367), it is one of the two major clusters comprising the Coma Supercluster. It is located in and takes its name from the constellation Coma Berenices.

The cluster's mean distance from Earth is 99 Mpc (321 million light years). Its ten brightest spiral galaxies have apparent magnitudes of 12–14 that are observable with amateur telescopes larger than 20 cm. The central region is dominated by two supergiant elliptical galaxies: NGC 4874 and NGC 4889. The cluster is within a few degrees of the north galactic pole on the sky. Most of the galaxies that inhabit the central portion of the Coma Cluster are ellipticals. Both dwarf and giant ellipticals are found in abundance in the Coma Cluster.

Cluster members

As is usual for clusters of this richness, the galaxies are overwhelmingly elliptical and S0 galaxies, with only a few spirals of younger age, and many of them probably near the outskirts of the cluster.

The full extent of the cluster was not understood until it was more thoroughly studied in the 1950s by astronomers at Mount Palomar Observatory, although many of the individual galaxies in the cluster had been identified previously.

Dark matter
The Coma Cluster is one of the first places where observed gravitational anomalies were considered to be indicative of unobserved mass. In 1933 Fritz Zwicky showed that the galaxies of the Coma Cluster were moving too fast for the cluster to be bound together by the visible matter of its galaxies.  Though the idea of dark matter would not be accepted for another fifty years, Zwicky wrote that the galaxies must be held together by "dunkle Materie" (dark matter).

About 90% of the mass of the Coma cluster is believed to be in the form of dark matter.  The distribution of dark matter throughout the cluster, however, is poorly constrained.

X-ray source
An extended X-ray source centered at 1300+28 in the direction of the Coma cluster of galaxies was reported before August 1966. This X-ray observation was performed by balloon, but the source was not detected in the sounding rocket flight launched by the X-ray astronomy group at the Naval Research Laboratory on November 25, 1964. A strong X-ray source was observed by the X-ray observatory satellite Uhuru close to the center of the Coma cluster and this source was suggested to be designated Coma X-1.
The Coma cluster contains about 800 galaxies within a 100 x 100 arc-min area of the celestial sphere. The source near the center at RA (1950) 12h56m ± 2m Dec 28°6' ± 12' has a luminosity Lx = 2.6 x 1044 ergs/s. As the source is extended, with a size of about 45', this argues against the possibility that a single galaxy is responsible for the emission. The Uhuru observations indicated a source strength of no greater than ~10−3 photons cm−2s−1keV−1 at 25 keV, which disagrees with the earlier observations claiming a source strength of ~10−2 photons cm−2s−1keV−1 at 25 keV, and a size of 5°.

Gallery

See also
 List of Abell clusters
 List of galaxy groups and clusters
 Eridanus Cluster
 Fornax Cluster – another nearby cluster of galaxies
 Norma Cluster
 Virgo Cluster – another nearby cluster of galaxies
 X-1 X-ray source

References

External links

 The Coma Cluster of Galaxies - Astronomy Picture of the Day, NASA, 2000 August 6
 The clickable Coma galaxy cluster
 The dynamical state of the Coma cluster with XMM-Newton
 Very Small Array observations of the Sunyaev-Zel'dovich effect in nearby galaxy clusters
 Hubble Space Telescope Treasury Survey of the Coma Cluster
 

 
Galaxy clusters
Coma Supercluster
Coma Berenices
1656
Abell richness class 2